Thomas Brady (September 1850 – March 13, 1928) was the 7th mayor of Bayonne, New Jersey, from 1904 to 1906.

Biography
Born around 1850 in County Meath, Ireland, Brady emigrated to the United States at the age of ten and settled in Portland, Maine. At age 20, he moved to Bayonne, New Jersey. He opened a grocery store and later, with his two of his brothers James and Terrence, started the Consumers' Coal and Ice Company in 1873. Brady helped establish a ferry from Bergen Point, at the southern tip of Bayonne, to Staten Island called the Bergen Point Port Richmond ferry. He then established a stage coach line from Greenville (modern day Jersey City) to the ferry at Bergen Point.

Brady, who was a Democrat, was appointed in 1885 by President Grover Cleveland to be the Postmaster of Bayonne. In 1903, Brady was elected mayor of Bayonne defeating Republican Pierre P. Garven and served for two years. In 1906, he returned to the company he helped found and worked there until his death at age 78.

After a two-year illness, Brady died on March 13, 1928, in his home. His funeral was at St. Andrew's R.C. Church in Bayonne. He is buried in Holy Name Cemetery in Jersey City. His wife Ellen had died two months earlier.

References

External links
 Thomas Brady on Find-A-Grave

1850 births
1928 deaths
Mayors of Bayonne, New Jersey
Politicians from County Meath
19th-century Irish people
Irish emigrants to the United States (before 1923)